Svetofor ('traffic light' in Russian) is a chain of discount supermarkets headquartered in Krasnoyarsk, Russia. The chain, owned by Torgservis, operates stores in Russia, Kazakhstan, Belarus and China. As of December 2019 its network comprised approximately 1,400 locations.

History 
In November 2017, the chain registered the MERE brand trademark with the European Union Intellectual Property Office, and the first store under this branding opened the following year in Snagov, Romania. MERE has since expanded into other European markets including Germany, Belarus, Lithuania and Poland, where it opened its first outlet in Częstochowa in July 2020. In 2021 it planned to open its first stores in the United Kingdom, Bulgaria, Austria, Spain and Italy. Launch in Slovakia was planned for 2022.

The company's operating model aims to undercut local supermarket prices by around 20-30% by having suppliers deliver directly to stores, keeping staffing levels low and displaying goods directly on the pallets on which they arrive.

Controversies 
In 2021, MERE was banned from operating in Ukraine due to its connections with Russian secret services.

In March 2022, MERE closed its only UK store, in Preston, due to political pressure caused by the war in Ukraine.

In early April 2022, activists in Poland organized a protest related to the criticism of Mere as a Russian network, in connection with Russia's invasion of Ukraine.

References

Retail companies of Russia
Russian brands
Food retailers of Russia
Russian companies established in 2009
Retail companies established in 2009